Votuporanga is a municipality in the Northwest of the São Paulo state, Brazil. The city is located 520 km from São Paulo. The population of the city, according to the IBGE, is 95,338 inhabitants. Votuporanga is the center of a Microregion with 159,475 inhabitants. In 2018, the Roman Catholic Diocese of Votuporanga was formed by Pope Francis.

History 
Votuporanga's history is closely linked to that of the coffee trade in Brazil. The land where the city is located originally belonged to the Marinheiro de Cima Farm, owned by Francisco Schmidt. Schmidt was forced to sell the land to Theodor Wille, owner of the Wille, Schmillinski e Cia. company, to settle outstanding debts. The land was thus divided up into plots and sold at a low price. Little by little the area's population began to grow, until at last, becoming part of the district of Vila Monteiro, now  Álvares Florence, and the municipal district of Monte Aprazível.

The name, Votuporanga, was suggested by Sebastião Almeida de Oliveira, notary public for the local town of Tanabi. Votuporanga, in Tupi language, means "Good winds" or "Soft breezes". The town on Votuporanga was founded on August 8, 1937. Father Isidoro Cordeiro Paranhos celebrated a Catholic mass on this same day, thus becoming one of the pillars of the town's heritage.

In 1945 Votuporanga was decreed to be a municipal district, and center for the local county. The first mayor was Francisco Villar Horta. In the same year, an important development took place with the arrival of the Railroad Araraquarense, providing a vital rail connection to the Port of Santos. Two other principal features of the city are the Santa Casa de Misericórdia hospital and the contemporary Igreja de Nossa Senhora Aparecida (Church of Our Lady Aparecida).

In the 1970s, the state highway Rodovia Euclides da Cunha, SP-320, which connects Votuporanga to the state capital, was tarmacked, helping to develop the growth of the town. Also around this time, the educational institution UNIFEV was created. In the 1980s, the city experienced economic growth, mainly in the Furniture, agricultural machinery industry and metalworking for the haulage industry.

The Name
In the Tupi language, votu means "air", "breeze" and poranga means "nice", "good". Literally this term means "good air", "good winds" or "soft breezes". The city is known as the "City of soft breezes".

Economy

73.85% of the city's GDP is generated by the Tertiary sector, and 23.61% comes from Industry.
Votuporanga has a significant furniture industry, characterized by small and medium companies. These firms employ around 15,000 workers.

Demographics

The HDI of the city, measured by the UNDP, was 0.817 in 2000.

Urban structure

Healthcare

Votuporanga has 2 hospitals, Santa Casa de Misericórdia de Votuporanga and Casa de Saúde e Maternidade Nossa Srª Aparecida. There are also 2 free access priority healthcare facilities for non-critical emergency treatment, Mini-Hospital "Fortunata G. Pozzobon" and an UPA 24hrs.

Education

There are 4 universities in the city: the UNIFEV, IFSP Câmpus Votuporanga, the REGES, and a branch of the FATEC (Faculdade de Teologia e Ciências).

Infrastructure

Culture

Votuporanga is well known for its nightlife. With the local motto "ímã da diversão" (Magnet of Entertainment), it is recognized as one of the most vibrant nightlife centres in the microregion.

Pride in Votuporanga's cow-breeding heritage is one of the cornerstones of Votuporangese identity. "Ópera," the most expensive cow ever sold in Brazil, is from the Votuporanga microregion. Numerous streets, a shopping centre and a local brothel are named in her honour.

Sports

The city has one professional football club, Clube Atlético Votuporanguense.

References

External links
 Official Votuporanga Website